You Were There for Me is a collaboration studio album of Peter Rowan and Tony Rice. The record marks their first full-fledged cooperation, though they had previously appeared on several albums together.

Track listing

Personnel
 Tony Rice — guitar
 Peter Rowan — vocals, guitar, mandola
 Bryn Davies — double bass, background vocals
 Larry Atamanuik — drums
 Billy Bright — mandola, mandolin
 Tony Garnier — double bass
 Robert Emery — background vocals

References

2004 albums
Tony Rice albums
Peter Rowan albums
Rounder Records albums